Dicksoniaceae is a group of tropical, subtropical and warm temperate ferns, treated as a family in the Pteridophyte Phylogeny Group classification of 2016 (PPG I), and counting 30-40 species. Alternatively, the family may be sunk into a very broadly defined family Cyatheaceae sensu lato as the subfamily Dicksonioideae. Most of the genera in the family are terrestrial ferns or have very short trunks compared to tree ferns of the family Cyatheaceae sensu stricto. However, some of the larger species can reach several metres in height. A number of others are epiphytes. They are found mostly in tropical regions in the Southern Hemisphere, as far south as southern New Zealand. Larger tree ferns in the genus Cibotium were formerly included in Dicksoniaceae, but are now segregated as the family Cibotiaceae.

Description
Species in the family are generally characterized by large pinnate fronds, 1–4 m long. The family includes several species of tree ferns, which grow a single trunk, notably the species in Dicksonia. All members of the family have long, tapering hairs composed of cells arranged end to end, unlike the scales characteristic of the Cyatheaceae s.l.

Evolution
The family is thought to have arisen in the Early Cretaceous, based on molecular evidence. Lophosoria is known from fossil spores and leaf fragments from South America dating to the Aptian. The oldest fossil of Dicksonia is known from the Eocene of Antarctica. The widespread Jurassic-Cretaceous herbaceous fern genus Coniopteris has historically been assigned to this family, but cladistic analysis suggests that it is more closely related to the Polypodiales. Relationships of the three living genera, after.

Genera
Only three extant genera are recognised in this monophyletic family:

References

 Classification of Ferns and Allies
 Large, M.F. and J.E. Braggins (2004). Tree Ferns. Timber Press. 
 Smith, A.R., K.M. Pryer, E. Schuettpelz, P. Korall, H. Schneider & P.G. Wolf 2006.   Taxon 55(3): 705-731.

External links

 
Cyatheales
Fern families